Chengde County is a county in the northeast of Hebei province, People's Republic of China. It is under the administration of the Chengde City.

Administrative Divisions
Towns: Xiabancheng, Shangbancheng, Jiashan, Liugou, Sangou, Tougou, Gaositai, Shuangfengsi

Townships: Dongxiaobaiqi Township, Anjiang Township, Liuzhangzi Township, Xinzhangzi Township, Mengjiayuan Township, Dayingzi Township, Bajia Township, Shanggu Township, Manzhangzi Township, Shihuiyao Township, Wudaohe Township, Chagou Township, Dengshan Township, Sanjia Township, Cangzi Township, Gangzi Manchu Ethnic Township, Liangjia Manchu Ethnic Township

Climate

Transportation
The Jinzhou–Chengde railway passes through the county and has several stops. The Beijing–Shenyang high-speed railway also has a single stop in the county, Chengdexian North railway station.

References

External links

County-level divisions of Hebei
Chengde